Kassian Dmitrievich Bogatyrets, or Kasyan Dmytrovych Bohatyrets (Rusyn and ; ; , Bogatireț, Bohatereț, or Bohatyretz; November 5, 1868 – July 28, 1960), was an Eastern Orthodox priest, church historian, and Rusyn community leader in Bukovina. Born a national of Austria-Hungary, he studied theology and history, and served the parish of Sadhora. He drew the suspicion of Austrian authorities attention with his open support for Russophile politics, and was persecuted after visiting the Russian Empire in 1908. He was arrested during the first days of World War I and deported to Sankt Marien, then tried for sedition in Vienna. He was scheduled to be executed by hanging in early 1917, but was freed by a general amnesty shortly before the Austrian monarchy crumbled.

Caught between Romanian and Ukrainian nationalisms, Bogatyrets hoped to obstruct Bukovina's incorporation into Greater Romania, or at least to preserve its autonomy. He eventually joined the Romanian Orthodox Church together with the whole Diocese of Bukovina, including his new parish at Coțmani (Kitsman). His ambitions to improve the standing of Romanian Rusyns were challenged by the Ukrainian National Party, and he remained the leader of a Russophile minority within the larger Ukrainian one. Bogatyrets championed the use of Slavic vernaculars in both education and church services, and did missionary work among the Ukrainians of Maramureș/Maramorosh. He also helped organize the Czechoslovak Orthodox Church on the other side of the border, in Carpathian Ruthenia.

World War II again challenged Bogatyrets' national affiliations, leading him to support reunification with the Russian Orthodox Church. He stayed behind in Soviet territory after the occupation of northern Bukovina but was eventually forced into exile. He lived in Nazi Germany and Romania to 1941, when the German–led invasion allowed him back to Cernăuți (Chernivtsi). For three years, he assisted Metropolitan Tit Simedrea and took over effective leadership of the Diocese when Simedrea left Bukovina. He joined the Ukrainian Exarchate in late 1944, welcoming back the Soviets, but was marginalized from 1949. His final work was as a historiographer of the regional church through its various administrative avatars.

Biography

Russophile leader
Bogatyrets was born in Kabivtsi–Kabin village, in the northern half of the Duchy of Bukovina (now in Chernivtsi Raion, Ukraine). His family was attested there from the era before the Austrian annexation, when the whole of Bukovina was part of Moldavia. The Bogatyretses had belonged to the rich Moldavian yeomanry (răzeși), but their lands had been scattered between male inheritors before Kassian's birth—his parents, Dmitry and Xenia, were officially registered as "farmers" or "peasants". Like several of his ancestors, Kassian was destined for a priestly career. He studied at the Volksschule and the gymnasium of Czernowitz (Chernivtsi), graduating with honors in 1889, then attended the Orthodox Theology Department of Franz Joseph I University, taking his diploma cum laude in 1893. He also had an interest in Ukrainian folklore, presenting his finds to the (mainly Romanian) Academia Ortodocsă Society of Czernowitz.

On May 11, 1897, he married Stefanida Veligorska, daughter of Priest Alexander from Oshyhliby. In June of the same year he was consecrated a deacon by Arcadie Ciupercovici, the Metropolitan of Bukovina and Dalmatia, taking an administrative position in Sadhora. In 1898, Bogatyrets became a Doctor of Divinity from the same Franz Joseph I University, having also taken advanced courses in Slavistics. He was moved from Sadhora to Orshivtsi in 1898, and in the following year to Stanivtsi.

Within that context, Bogatyrets emerged as a figure of importance among the Bukovina Russophiles (or "Old Ruthenians"). The faction was led by Orthodox theologian Eugene Hakman and scholar Jevhen Kozak; its adversaries were "Ukrainophiles", Greek Catholics, and modernizing "Young Ruthenians" such as Hierotheus Pihuliak and Nikolai von Wassilko. The Russophile movement as a whole was discouraged by the Austrian administrators, who backed the Pihuliak faction. When Bogatyrets applied for a lecturer's chair at his alma mater, he received a veto from the Austrian officials and Metropolitan Arcadie. He continued his ministry, receiving commendation. In 1901, he rose to the position of parish priest, and, in this capacity, began a long-lasting career in popular education and political activism, establishing reading rooms and cooperative societies, and spreading Russophile ideas among his parishioners.

In 1908, having been granted the honorific title of Exarch, Bogatyrets visited the Russian Empire. At Saint Petersburg, he gave a controversial lecture, taken up by Novoye Vremya newspaper. It suggested that Bukovina had been an integral part of Kievan Rus' (and, as such, that it was a Russian irredenta), while also criticizing the Austrian officials for their Ukrainophile policy. A formal investigation was ordered in Czernowitz. Upon return to Bukovina, which coincided with a major clampdown on Russophile and Rusyn activities, Bogatyrets was demoted to the parish of Verenchanka, west of Zastavna. He still contributed to the Rusyn protests of that year, joining the delegation which petitioned Governor Bourguignon. In early 1910, rumor spread across Austria that he was part of a Russian spy ring, and that he had been deposed by the Metropolitan over this issue. He ran, unsuccessfully, in the 1911 elections for the Diet of Bukovina, a candidate and regional leader of the Rusyns' Russian National Party.

Imprisonment and return

By January 1914, a renewed clampdown on the "Old Ruthenian" movement left Bogatyrets without his parish. In August–September, just as World War I broke out, areas of Bukovina fell to a Russian occupation. Before the Austrian evacuation, Czernowitz's police chief, Konstantin Tarangul von Valea Utsei, ordered Bogatyrets' arrest. He was transferred to an internment camp at Sankt Marien, in Upper Austria, then to the prison-garrison of Vienna. Stefanida was also detained some days after her husband, and deported to Talerhof. Bogatyrets was eventually tried, alongside Hilarion Tsurkanovich (Curkanovič) and 20 other defendants, from September 14, 1916, to February 17, 1917. As he himself later recalled, the indictment was 360 pages in length, all of them "fictitious". He was one of 17 sentenced to death by hanging. An appeal was filed, although, allegedly, Bogatyrets had refused to ask for clemency. Eventually, under the terms of a general amnesty granted by Emperor Charles, all the defendants were spared punishment, and Bogatyrets was assigned domicile in Graz.

Eventually, in September 1917, Bogatyrets was allowed back in Verenchanka to resume work as a parson. By November 1918, the Austrian monarchy had collapsed. Bukovina, following skirmishes between the Ukrainian Galician and Romanian armies, was occupied by the latter. As the Romanian provisional military administration negotiated a transition to civilian rule, he reemerged as his community's political organizer; the core Ukrainian leadership, including Pihuliak, Stepan Smal-Stotskyi, and Volodymyr Zalozetsky-Sas, had left the region in protest, confident that the Paris Peace Conference would rule in favor of the Ukrainian People's Republic.

For a while, Bogatyrets cooperated with the conservative Romanian Iancu Flondor of the General Congress, who supported regional autonomy for Bukovina within Greater Romania. In June, Romanian General Nicolae Petala heard complaints from a trans-ethnic coalition, expressing support for the autonomy of Bukovina: Bogatyrets was a representative of all Ukrainian groups; others to speak were the Romanians Flondor and George Grigorovici, Germans Albert Kohlruss and Rudolf Gaidosch, and Jews Mayer Ebner and Iacob Pistiner. As the Ukrainian People's Republic lost ground to the rival Ukrainian Soviet Socialist Republic, Bogatyrets signed a plea addressed to the Allies. Presented there by the Czechoslovak delegation, it argued for the creation of a new Ukrainian state—comprising Bukovina, Eastern Galicia, Carpathian Ruthenia, Bessarabia, and Maramureș/Maramorosh. Bogatyrets had included a historical overview, which asserted that Bukovina was ancestrally Ruthenian, and a map, which suggested that the Ukrainians and Rusyns were a majority of the population in Bukovina.

In Romanian Bukovina and second exile
Eventually, Bukovina was incorporated into the Romanian state. Bogatyrets and Kozak agreed to a boycott of the November 1919 election, noting the Ukrainian-and-Ruthenian liberties were being trampled upon by the authorities. The letter of protest was also signed by their Ukrainophile rivals. Bogatyrets revised this stance within months, running for the Assembly of Deputies in the May 1920 election, at Zastavna. He lost by a large margin (640 to 2,994) to Constantin Krakalia of the Socialist Party. This defeat signaled the ultimate decline of "Old Ruthenian" politics among the Ukrainians of Romania; from 1928, the forefront was taken by Zalozetsky-Sas and his Ukrainian National Party, which formed successful partnerships with mainstream Romanian politicians.

By 1921, Bogatyrets had affiliated with the newly created Czechoslovak Orthodox Church, taking part in its missionary activities among the Ukrainians of Mukačevo. A professor emeritus of canon law at his alma mater (re-baptized Carol I University of Cernăuți), he contributed directly to the drafting of the Czechoslovak Church constitution ca. 1928. He focused his other activities on the administration of the Czernowitz Diocese, by then part of the Romanian Orthodox Church. In 1925, Bogatyrets was elected as a Rusyn representative to the Diocesan Assembly; Petro Katerynyuk represented the Ukrainians, and the other delegates were Romanian. He took up advocacy for both the Ukrainians and the Rusyns of Romania, demanding that school be taught in the native language throughout the Diocese, and asking for an official prayer book (Molitvoslov) for native use. He was especially critical of Romanianization, describing his defense of Rusyn identity as an "impossible fight".

An Archpriest from 1929, he moved to the parish of Coțmani in 1930 (where he served until 1940), and was also tasked by Metropolitan Visarion Puiu with coordinating missionary activities at Nistru, Maramureș. His work was supposed to ensure a tighter union between the parishes of Maramureș and Bukovina and to combat the influence of Ukrainian Greek Catholics. By 1931, Bogatyrets was involved in a direct dispute over political legitimacy with Zalozetsky-Sas. Bogatyrets found favor with the Romanian Bukovinian Constantin Isopescu-Grecul, who recognized him as "the true leader" and "a person of great character". His campaign for linguistic pluralism ended abruptly in April 1937, when the Diocesan Council ruled in favor of disciplinary sanctions for priests who took up languages other than Romanian in their sermons or at Sunday school. However, in 1939, the Romanian state authorized Bogatyrets to receive and wear the Gold Cross of Merit, awarded by the Second Polish Republic.

In July 1940, following a Soviet ultimatum, the Romanian administration withdrew from northern Bukovina. Bogatyrets and another 131 parish priests of the Diocese stayed behind in Soviet territory, under a Russian Orthodox bishop, Damaskin (Malyuta). Bogatyrets declared himself a Ukrainian by nationality—although, according to the Rusyn researcher S. G. Sulyak, he only did so under pressure to conform with the Soviet policy on nationalities. In short time, the regime began nationalizing all Church property and stopped the payment of salaries, deporting some of the clergy to the Gulag. The priests complained and asked to be allowed back into the Romanian Church; the authorities responded by letting them leave the country. As a result, all but 22 of the parish priests crossed the border into Nazi Germany and Occupied Poland.

Bogatyrets was one of those who seized this opportunity, leaving with Stefanida and his two children (Nicolae and Nadezhda). They would spend some six months at Leubus Monastery, Gau Silesia, where Father Kassian treated his illness and did research in the library. He was registered as a refugee in the Leubus camp for prisoners-of-war, and visited there by the Romanian Commission. Eventually, the Commission obtained that he and his family be returned to Romania, where Bogatyrets served as a parish priest in Monteoru. In July 1941, the German–led attack on the Soviet Union brought the Romanian administration back into northern Bukovina. After protracted negotiations, the Bogatyretses were also allowed to return to Bukovina in September, settling in Cernăuți. Tit Simedrea, the new head of Bukovina Diocese, made Father Cassian his confessor, assigned to Intrarea în biserică (Svyato Vvedensky) Monastery.

Soviet years
In March 1944, as northern Bukovina fell back to the Soviets, Metropolitan Simedrea took refuge in Romania with most of the Bukovina clergy, but Bogatyrets did not follow. Aware of the improved status of the Russian Church and disappointed by the Romanianization campaign under Ion Antonescu, he decided to continue with the Diocese. He welcomed the Red Army, and provided some thousands of roubles in donations for the war effort. He became suffragan bishop, preparing full communion with the Russian Church, and eventually handing over leadership to Metropolitan Theodosius of the Ukrainian Exarchate. The transitional process recognized all of the Romanian ordinations, but made a return to the Julian calendar. While overseeing these changes as suffragan or as Theodosius' assistant, Bogatyrets simultaneously served as confessor at Svyato Vvedensky (which became the diocesan seat upon his eviction from the Metropolitan Palace) and head priest at St. Nicolas Cathedral in Chernivtsi (Czernowitz).

Stefanida Bogatyrets died on August 31, 1944, leaving him to enter monastic life; her children, meanwhile, had emigrated to France. Kassian spent much of the following year writing Краткую историю Буковинской епархии ("A Brief History of the Bukovina Eparchy"), on behalf of Metropolitan Theodosius and the Russian Synod. He continued work on an extended version, asking Theodosius' permission to study the Bukovinian archive in Kiev—although he probably never managed to do so. Following requests from the Ukrainian SSR government and the Museum of Local Lore, he wrote historical notices on the Metropolitan Palace and the local spread of the Lipovan, Baptist, Pentecostal and Adventist churches. In 1946, he was made a Stavrophore and received from the Soviet state the Medal "For Valiant Labour in the Great Patriotic War 1941–1945".

Although he could not persuade the Soviets to return the Metropolitan Palace, nor to grant permission for a pastoral magazine, Bogatyrets managed to obtain the resumption of theological training at the university, and obtained their support for his anti-sectarian missionary work. Late in 1947, Theodosius, who was taking a new seat at Kirovograd, recommended Bogatyrets as his replacement in Chernivtsi, highlighting his scholarly competence and Russophile stances. This proposal was dismissed by Patriarch Alexius, who considered Bogatyrets politically unreliable. The church effectively demoted him to the rank of Protoiereus, since the rank of Archpriest was unused in Russian Orthodoxy. However, in 1955 the consistory provided him with a monthly pension of 2,000 roubles, citing his contribution to church life during the Austrian era, as well as his scientific work. Bogatyrets was also snubbed by the Soviet state. His house on Pravda Street was nationalized in 1949, and he moved with his books to an apartment on Kvitki-Osnovyanenko. He was only granted citizenship and a Soviet Union passport in 1954.

Bogatyrets retired from his ministry in 1955, after a serious illness, and bequeathed his books to the church. He died on July 28, 1960. He was buried two days later at the family crypt in Chernivtsi Cemetery, with a large funeral procession attended by his former parishioners. He had not finished his life's work as a historian, История Буковинской епархии ("History of the Bukovina Eparchy"), never having started the planned chapters on church history after 1950. Days after his burial, the KGB confiscated many of his books, and the manuscript was presumed lost; however, a typewritten copy had been kept by Bogatyrets' niece, Evgenya V. Gorzhu. The work also doubled as a compendium of regional history, from the Scythians, Dacians and Bolokhoveni to the author's day. Much interest was paid to the persecution of the church under the Austrians, and to Rusyn–Romanian struggles for control of the Diocese. Bogatyrets' text also contained noted factual errors, misdating the first use of the name "Bukovina" to 1392 (instead of the historical 1412); details on church history under the 1914 Russian occupation and much of World War II were entirely absent.

Notes

References
M. K. Chuchko, S. G. Sulyak, "Архипресвитер Кассиан Богатырец исследователь церковной истории Буковинской Руси", in Rusyn, Issue 1 (35)/2014, pp. 143–164.
Vitaly Gaysenyuk, "Репрессии австрийских властей против москвофилов Буковины в годы Первой мировой войны", in Codrul Cosminului, Nr. 2 (2014), pp. 443–462.
Florin-Răzvan Mihai, "Dinamica electorală a candidaților minoritari din Bucovina la alegerile generale din România interbelică", in Vasile Ciobanu, Sorin Radu (eds.), Partide politice și minorități naționale din România în secolul XX, Vol. V, pp. 77–102. Sibiu: TechnoMedia, 2010. 
Serhiy Yaremchuk, "Життєвий шлях православного священика Кассіана Богатирця", in Питання історії України: Збірник наукових статей, т. 6. На пошану професора Павла Михайлини, pp. 275–280. Chernivtsi: Zelena Bukovina, 2003. 

1868 births
1960 deaths
Politicians of Bukovina
Russophiles of Galicia
19th-century Eastern Orthodox priests
20th-century Eastern Orthodox priests
Romanian Orthodox clergy
Russian Orthodox clergy
Members of the Orthodox Church of the Czech Lands and Slovakia
Romanian Christian missionaries
Eastern Orthodox missionaries
Romanian people of Rusyn descent
Ukrainian people of Rusyn descent
Ukrainian historians of religion
Soviet historians
20th-century Romanian historians
Historians of the Russian Orthodox Church
People from Chernivtsi Oblast
Chernivtsi University alumni
Academic staff of Chernivtsi University
Austro-Hungarian people of World War I
People convicted of treason against Austria-Hungary
Austrian prisoners sentenced to death
People paroled from death sentence
Romanian refugees
Romanian expatriates in Germany
Romanian people of World War II
Ukrainian people of World War II
Naturalized citizens of Ukraine
Recipients of the Gold Cross of Merit (Poland)